Petar Smajić (1910–1985) was a Croatian painter and sculptor. His works can be found at the Croatian Museum of Naïve Art in Zagreb.

References

External links
Biography

1910 births
1985 deaths
20th-century Croatian painters
Croatian male painters
20th-century Croatian sculptors
20th-century Croatian male artists